Éditions Elyzad is a Tunisian publishing house, with its headquarters in Tunis. Founded in 2005, it publishes French literary works. Associated personalities include leïla Sebbar, Tahar Bekri, Sophie Bessis, Cécile Oumhani and Théo Ananissoh, and it also has a role to play in discovering new talents such as 
Yamen Manaï, Ilf Eddine or Azza Filali. In 2011, Elyzad received the Alioune Diop prize from the Organisation internationale de la Francophonie.

References

External links
Official site 

Publishing companies of Tunisia
Organisations based in Tunis
Mass media in Tunis
2005 establishments in Tunisia
Companies established in 2005